The 1998 United States Senate election in South Dakota was held November 2, 1998. Incumbent Democratic U.S. Senator Tom Daschle won re-election to a third term. , this was the last time the Democrats won the Class 3 Senate seat from South Dakota.

Republican primary

Candidates 
 Alan Aker
 John Sanders
 Ron Schmidt, attorney

Results

General election

Candidates 
 Byron Dale (L)
 Tom Daschle (D), incumbent U.S. Senator
 Ron Schmidt (R), attorney

Results

See also 
 1998 United States Senate elections

References 

South Dakota
1998
United States Senate